The Metalex MTX Tatra V8 also known as the Metalex MTX V8 GT 3900 in Western Europe was a super-sports car produced by MTX in cooperation with Tatra in 1991. It was designed by Czech automobile designer Václav Král and was the fastest Czech car of that time. Acceleration from 0 to 100 km/h (0-62 mph) is given as 5.6 seconds and the maximum speed is 265 km/h (165 mph).

After it passed driving tests at the Tatra polygon races at Kopřivnice, at the airport in Mošnov and at the autodrom in Most, it was finally introduced to the public in October 1991 at the auto show in Prague. After that, MTX received almost 200 orders for the car, so the company started production of a limited series of 100 units. When the project was sold to a new owner during the early stages of production, the factory suffered a fire that forever terminated volume manufacturing of the car.

Only four Tatra MTX V8s were ever built; a red and a white one that have Czech private owners, a black one that is exhibited in the Sports Car Museum in Lány, and a fourth was reportedly delivered as a kit to the United States. In 2010 the car appeared in the Kanye West film Runaway, which was recorded in Prague, Czech Republic.

Specifications 
 wheelbase: 
 length: 
 weight: 
 tyre sizes: wheels OZ Racing, tyres Pirelli P Zero 245/40 ZR-17 front, 335/35 ZR-17 back
 motor: Tatra 623, air-cooled V8 32v DOHC
 displacement: 3,919 cc (3.9L)
 max. power :  at 6,000 rpm,  at 6,500 rpm (injection version)
 top speed: 246 km/h, 265 km/h (injection version)
 0–100 km/h (0-62 mph): 6.2 s, 5.6 s (injection version)

See also
 Tatra (company)

References

External links 
 MTX Tatra V8 on youtube.com
 MTX Tatra V8 on askmen.com

Sports cars
Tatra vehicles